The Palasinaz Lakes ( in Italian) are a group of lakes located in the Italian Alps, in the Aosta Valley region of northern Italy. They are of glacial origin and are situated in the southern foothills of the Monte Rosa group and are accessible from the villages of Brusson and Champoluc. The group is composed of the following lakes: the Lac Long, the Lago Pocia, the Lac du Couloir, the Lac Vert, and, the Lago della Battaglia.

Above them rises Corno Bussola—or Mont de Boussolaz—a mountain in the Pennine Alps.

Location
The Palasinaz Lakes are located in the Valle d'Ayas, in the North-western region of the Aosta Valley, in the province of Aosta. This is one of the mountainous regions of Italy along the border with France and Switzerland. The Val d'Ayas denomination is modern, mainly used following the birth of mountaineering. The territory of Ayas, at the top of the valley, then became a pole of attraction. The previous cartography uses the denomination "Val Challant" or "Val de Challant-Ayas".

Brusson 
The village is home to 852 inhabitants, who recognise both French and Italian as languages. Brusson is a tourist destination, characterized by a particularly mild climate; the landscape is full of springs and lakes and is the destination for walks in the summer.

Estoul
The village of Estoul can be reached from Brusson, where the downhill slopes cross the larch forests and go towards Punta Palasinaz. Nine families live in the village of Estoul, which has a total of nineteen inhabitants. In this village there are 52 buildings, but only 41 are used of which 32 are for residential purposes, while 9 are intended for commercial or other use.

It is located in the upper part of the Messouère stream valley on the eastern side of the Val d'Ayas. From the village of Brusson, it is possible to reach the village by a steep but practicable asphalted road, which ends at an altitude of 1892m.

The five lakes 

The Palasinaz Lakes area, located above Brusson, is a high altitude lake environment set in a natural environment of fertile alpine pastures. Its name derives from the term patois, which stands for steep pasture, as evidenced by medieval documentary sources.

This area consists of several lakes, all of which were formed through glacial excavation: Lac Long (located below the Colle Bussola, Long lake); Lac Pocia (Little Lake), which is at the base of the Palasinaz hill. The view from the Lac Pocia is wider than the view from the other lakes due to the higher altitude reached. The lake has an unrivaled amount of colors ranging from light gray to light blue, blue, green, brown with almost clear boundaries between one color and another; Lac du Couloir (Corridor Lake), whose waters, together with those of Lac Vert (Green Lake), flow into the great Lago della Battaglia (Lake of Battle). This last lake is the largest of the group and is characterized by a trapezoidal shape and a large promontory that almost divides the entire lake in two. The Lac du Couloir is located in a small glacial excavation basin.
{
  "type": "FeatureCollection",
  "features": [
    {
      "type": "Feature",
      "properties": {},
      "geometry": {
        "type": "Point",
        "coordinates": [
          7.756716727162713,
          45.789815221948885
        ]
      }
    }
  ]
}

Climate
The climate in the Palasinaz Lakes area is cold and temperate. Temperatures often fall below 0° Celsius during the second half of September, and start to rise back up again above 0° Celsius in the second half of May. Cold temperature also increseases the possibility of significant snowfalls in the area and on the paths. Consequently, the lakes partially freeze (usually between October and April)

Geology

The Lakes are located along the Aosta-Ranzola Fault Line, which began to form a part of the Franco-Italian Alps between 40 and 49 Ma (million years) ago.

Ancient remains of volcanic chimneys dating back to the Oligocene Epoch - approximately 35 to 22 Ma - have been found in the Palasinaz Lakes area. These volcanic chimneys, whose cones are now not visible, are composed of dark coloured andesite and lamprophyre rocks.

Other geological characteristics include rust-colored micaschists at the top of Punta Palasinaz, as well light green greenschist and calcite formations in the area.

History

Ancient history 
The Palasinaz Lakes area's history dates back to ancient times. It is believed that the lakes were used as a natural cemetery for people who lost their lives in the mines nearby.  They are believed to have been first used by Salassi tribe, and later on by the Romans, whose presence was evidenced by the discovery of coins dating back to the Roman Period. The lakes were important for sustaining local villagers, due to the presence of fresh water and wide pastures.

The feudal era 
In the feudal era, stretch of time between the 5th and 13th centuries, the peasants and shepherds of the Alps had to provide the lord with butter, cheese and other products of the earth. The existence of villages, such as Estoul (from the Latin term stabulum "barn, stall"), is evidenced by documents of that period. In the thirteenth century, the area of the Palasinaz was called Palleysina and it was in possession of the lords of Gressoney. It appeared in 1323 in the will of Ebalo of Challant and even earlier in the account of the feudal investiture of Gotofredo of Challant, dated 28 July 1263, in which the amount of money that the nobles had to pay yearly to the convent of San Maurizio Agaunese for these lands was set.

Conflicts on Lago della Battaglia 
The biggest lake of the area, Lago della Battaglia, owes its name to a clash that took place on its shores either during the Thirty Years' War (1619-1648), where the Holy Roman Empires were in conflict with a network of Protestant towns and principalities, or during the Napoleonic wars (1803-1815), where Great Britain and France fought for supremacy over Europe. Approximately 600 men lost their lives in the conflict. In this same period Colle della Ranzola was fortified.

Flora and fauna

Fauna 

The area is the habitat of many different mountain animals, such as eagles and Alpine Ibexes of which the latter are mainly sighted on the summit of the Corno Bussola. There have also been sightings of Roe Deer, Chamois, marmots, and Black Grouses in the region.

According to the Regional Agency for Environmental Protection, Lake Pocia is characterized by fish fauna but lacks aquatic vegetation although its banks are rich in cotton grass. However, both aquatic vegetation and fish species are present in and around Lago della Battaglia.

Flora 
The Aosta Valley, despite being the smallest region in Italy and largely made up of sterile rocks and glaciers, preserves a distinct biodiversity. This region is home to over 2,000 different plants, which represent about 40% of all plant species in Italy. The great variety of species is due to the many natural habitats present in the area, diversified according to altitude, exposure, rainfall and geological substrate. A diverse range of alpine plant species are found in the Palasinaz Lakes region towards the end of June, including Vitaliana Primulaeflora, wild tulips and Eritrichium Nanum. There are also various species of Artemisias' in the area, including the one used for the production of Genepi.

The Arp Botanical Garden
A botanical garden is located near the Arp refuge, which aims to preserve the plant life in the area. It contains 84 species of plants, a wetland and a path with some of the typical rocks of the Aosta Valley area. Within the botanical garden there are many medicinal plants, flowers from the Val d'Ayas area and many other plant species, including rosettes, fat leaved plants and Eriophorum Scheuchzeri. Many of these plants can be exclusively found in the botanical garden and not in the surrounding wildlife.

The Parcour di Bério
The "Parcour di bério", built starting in the summer of 2005 and inaugurated in 2009, is located behind the ARP refuge and has 17 types of rocks that characterize the Ayas Valley and the Aosta Valley. Set up upstream of the rock, to complete the area dedicated to alpine flora, a small geological path has been created and collects the most significant rocks of the region: each sample, accompanied by an explanatory tag, tells a "piece" of the history of the Aosta Valley. The Alps of the Aosta Valley are filled with lithologies, among the richest in the world; thanks to the internal movements of the earth's crust they overlap and interpenetrate each other. Some of the most important rocks are: Gypsum (evaporite rock), Mont Blanc granite (magmatic rock), Limestone (sedimentary rock) and Carniola (carbonate rock).

Recreational activities

During the summer, numerous sports activities such as trekking, climbing, mountain biking, fishing and horse riding can be carried out.

Rifugio Arp 

The Arp refuge is located in the upper Ayas valley in the Palasinaz region. Rifugio ARP can be reached in about two hours on foot or by mountain bike starting from Estoul.

The refuge has 19 rooms, furnished in a rustic mountain style, and a restaurant that serves traditional dishes of the Aosta Valley. During the winter the refuge can only be reached with snowshoes and mountaineering skis.

The refuge is the starting point for several peaks in the area:

Hiking routes 
The Palasinaz lakes represent one of the most important elements of glacial origin in the Monte Rosa group. There are several paths that encompass the Palasinaz Lakes area, including:

Path: Palasinaz hill (Route 14)
This path (designated path number 14) starts from Champoluc. It is recommended to experienced mountain walkers as it is long and demanding, with a height gain of almost . This path ascends via Mascognaz on the Palasinaz hill in about three and a half hours. From the top of the Palasinaz Hill, the descent to the lakes is less physically demanding: the path becomes grassy and downhill on the stretch towards Lac du Couloir - the first lake on the route - located just below the hill.

Path: Estoul - Laghi Palasinaz (Route 11b)
In order to reach the summit in the shortest possible time, the Rifugio Arp, Litteran Lake and the crossing of the Colle Bringuez are excluded from this route. It incorporates some flat paths, normally used by beginners and families with children. This ascent can also be utilized as the approach to excursions requiring more experience. One of these is itinerary 42, which leads to Corno Bussola, a mountain in the Pennine Alps.

This path is known as the "Itineraire des fromages", and is linked to several mountain pastures. The start is in the car park at the beginning of the dirt road before the ascent to the refuge. Continuing the climb and following the yellow signs indicating routes 5 and 6, the trail goes up one of the local ski slopes. After passing the chair lifts from Estoul and rejoining the gravel road, crossing the Chavanne Alp allows the entrance to the Palasinaz Valley.   

There is a shorter deviation, bypassing Lake Litteran. There are two alternative routes which both lead to the Rifugio Arp: the one on the right leads to the Alpeggio Palasinaz Inferiore, while the one on the left leads to the Alpeggio Superiore. After rejoining path 4, the path continues to Lago della Battaglia - or Lacs de la Bataille - the first of the five lakes. There is a small stone bridge here, which replaced the previous weir in 2006.

At this point, there are three options: stop here, continue south towards the Colle Bringuez, or north-west towards the Colle Palasinaz and the Corno Bussola. The second choice is convenient if the route is snowy or in case of little experience in trekking on the mountains.

Path: Lakes - Corno Bussola 

A second bridge is reached along the northern shore of Lago della Battaglia. There is a small canal in correspondence with this bridge, which connects the previous lake with Lac Vert (or Lago Verde).   

Following the main route, the trail continues to the right towards Lac du Colouir and Colle di Palasinaz. The less demanding variant heads straight for the Corno Bussola.

Climbing towards the Corno Bussola, following the 3D trail that takes about an hour, Lac Pocia (or Lagp della Pocia, 2518m) is reached. It is then possible to observe the steep ascent, which runs entirely along the ridge, leading to the next lake, Lac Long (or Lago Lungo, 2720m).

This lake has deep blue waters and is dominated by the rocky walls of the Punta del Lago (or Cima del Lago) and a crossroad joins the route to the one descending from the Corno Bussola. Here, the first stretches equipped with fixed ropes as handrails and metal steps commence, assisting hikers in proceeding on the path along an exposed ledge.

The route continues along the entire length of the crest, up to the destination. On the ridge it is possible to see edelweiss bushes, typical of high altitudes.

On the summit of the Corno Bussola (or Mont de Boussolaz), the highest elevation in the area, there is a large metal cross made up of 24 cubic elements, at the base of which is the summit register. Trekkers can fill it in, leaving a message for future hikers. From the top it is also possible to view other important mountains such as the Matterhorn, Mont Blanc, Gran Paradiso, and many others.

Curiosities (Lago di Bringuez) 
The "Bocchet" pass or Colle di Bringuez (2,664m) - south-east of the Corno Bussola and immediately north of the lake - acts as a connection between the Palasinaz Lakes.

Situated at the bottom of a grassy hollow, enclosed by high rock walls, the lake is a deep basin of rather large dimensions. The latter is further accentuated by the steepness of the depression.

However, it is a rather steep itinerary with a considerable difference in altitude. For this reason, it is not recommended to visit the area when weather warnings in the area are present, especially if there are southerly winds.

According to popular legends, the lake is also called 'The Black Lake of Bringuez' and was known as one of the many "witches' lakes". Due to the almost vertical walls surrounding the lake and the particular exposure to the air from the south, violent thunderstorms can easily occur. These are caused by the warm and humid southerly currents that can condense and form clouds, rain and hail.

It is said that the lake was inhabited by witches with long hair, that would create clouds and hail, evidenced by the fact that sometimes hairs were found in the grains. A piglet was responsible for driving the storm over the cultivated fields, causing immense damage.

Gallery

See also

References

External links 
 Laghi Palasinaz 
 Excursions in the Aosta Valley 
 Rifugio Arp 
 Tourism in the Aosta Valley 

Hiking trails in Italy
Alps
Lakes of Aosta Valley
Brusson, Aosta Valley